Charles Charters Mason (February 1, 1912 – May 18, 1971) was a Canadian professional ice hockey right winger who played 93 games with the New York Rangers, New York Americans, Detroit Red Wings, and Chicago Black Hawks in the National Hockey League between 1934 and 1939. 

He was born in Seaforth, Ontario.

Career statistics

Regular season and playoffs

External links 
 

1912 births
1971 deaths
Buffalo Bisons (AHL) players
Canadian ice hockey right wingers
Canadian expatriate ice hockey players in the United States
Chicago Blackhawks players
Cleveland Barons (1937–1973) players
Detroit Red Wings players
New York Rangers players
People from Huron County, Ontario
Philadelphia Ramblers players
Philadelphia Rockets players
Pittsburgh Hornets players
Providence Reds players
Saskatchewan Huskies ice hockey players
Springfield Indians players
Vancouver Lions players